Radio man or variations may refer to:

 Radio operator, a person responsible for operating a telecommunications device
 Radioman (RM), a technical rating in the U.S. Navy
 Tank radioman, a position in an armoured fighting vehicle
 Repairman who specializes in radios
 Radio personality, a presenter who works over the radio
 Radio Man (born 1951), nickname of a formerly homeless New Yorker, known for wearing a radio while appearing in cameos on TV and film
 Radioman (film) Documentary film about the formerly homeless man
 The Radio Man (novel), a 1948 science fiction novel by Ralph Milne Farley
 Radiomen (novel), a 2015 science fiction novel by Eleanor Lerman

See also

 Radio Le Mans, an English-language radio service for the 24 Hours of Le Mans motorcar endurance race
 Radio (disambiguation)
 Man (disambiguation)